In histology, variegation is the property of having discrete markings of different colors.

References

Histology